Alessio is an Italian male given name, and also surname. It may also refer to:

Places
 Italian name for Lezhë, which was also often used in other languages before WW II

Other 
 Santi Bonifacio ed Alessio, a basilica in Rome
 Alessio–Bianchi, an Italian professional cycling team
 Alessio (wheels), an Italian alloy wheels manufacturer and Italian professional cycling team

See also
 Alessia, a given name
 D'Alessio, a surname
 Sant'Alessio (disambiguation)